The Robert Dietz Farmhouse is a historic house in the North Valley of Albuquerque, New Mexico. It was originally a one-story farmhouse built in 1914 by Robert Dietz, a native of Syracuse, New York, who moved to Albuquerque in 1910 like many others seeking treatment for tuberculosis. A second story was added in 1928, turning the building into a "grand home". The Dietz family lived and farmed there until the 1940s. It was listed on the New Mexico State Register of Cultural Properties in 1983 and the National Register of Historic Places in 1984.

The Dietz house is a two-story stuccoed frame building aligned along a north–south axis. The house design is a vernacular adaptation of Prairie School architecture, with a low, overhanging hip roof, and sash windows arranged in bands surrounded by wooden trim to "create an impression of horizontality". The house has over 100 windows in total. A stable on the property is also included in the National Register listing.

References

Houses on the National Register of Historic Places in New Mexico
National Register of Historic Places in Albuquerque, New Mexico
Houses in Albuquerque, New Mexico
New Mexico State Register of Cultural Properties
Houses completed in 1914